The following discography is a work in progress. Currently it contains all known published recordings by Enrico Caruso made through 1904 and some from his early years recording for the Victor Talking Machine Company in the United States. The recordings are listed chronologically by recording date, title, composer and matrix number. A list of unpublished recordings follows the main discography. When more than one "take" was recorded for a selection, only the published take number appears after the matrix number; occasionally, multiple takes of the same selection have been issued. If only one take was recorded, no take number is listed after the matrix number. Matrix numbers should not be confused with catalog numbers.

Recordings

Victor Talking Machine Company

19 December 1908 
Faust (Gounod) Alerte! Alerte!	with Geraldine Farrar and Félix Vieuille C6679 [destroyed]
Faust (Gounod) Que voulez-vous, Messieurs? with Emilio de Gogorza, Félix Vieuille C6681 [destroyed]
Il trovatore (Verdi) Mal reggendo all'aspro assalto with Louise Homer C6682

6 November 1909

7 November 1909

27 December 1909

6 January 1910 
Faust (Gounod) Il se fait tard	with Geraldine Farrar C8533
Faust (Gounod) Eternelle with Geraldine Farrar C8534

12 January 1910 
Faust (Gounod) Mon coeur est pénétré d'epouvante with Geraldine Farrar C8542
Faust (Gounod) Attends! Voici la rue with Geraldine Farrar C8543
Faust (Gounod) Seigneur Dieu! with Geraldine Farrar, Marcel Journet, Gabrielle Lejeune-Gilibert C8544	
Faust (Gounod) Prison scene, part III	with Geraldine Farrar, Marcel Journet C8545
Faust (Gounod)	Eh quoi, toujours seule	with Geraldine Farrar, Marcel Journet, Gabrielle Lejeune-Gilibert C8547

16 January 1910 
Faust (Gounod) O merveille! with Marcel Journet C8555
Faust (Gounod)	Que voulez-vous, messieurs? with Marcel Journet, Antonio Scotti C8556

25 January 1917 
Rigoletto (Verdi) Bella figlia dell'amor with Amelita Galli-Curci, Flora Perini and Giuseppe De Luca

16 April 1918 
 A la luz de la luna with de Gogorza C-21773 
 Sei Morta Nella Vita Mia (Costa) C-21774 (not released commercially)

References

Bibliography
John Richard Bolig, Caruso Records: A History and Discography, Mainspring Press, 2002 .
Pekka Gronow, Ilpo Saunio, International History of the Recording Industry, Continuum, 1999 .

External links
Conversation with John Bolig about his book, Caruso Records: A History and Discography

Opera singer discographies
Enrico Caruso albums
Caruso